The 1972 Uber Cup was the fifth edition of the Uber Cup, the women's badminton team competition. The tournament took place in the 1971-1972 badminton season, 17 countries competed. Japan won its third title in the Uber Cup, after beating the Indonesia team 6-1 in the Final Round in Tokyo, Japan.

Teams
17 teams from 4 regions took part in the competition. As defending champion, Japan skipped the qualifications and played directly in the final round of the inter-zone ties (team matches), effectively the semifinals of the tournament.

Australasian zone

Asian zone
 (exempt from qualifying rounds)

European zone

Panamerican zone

From the qualifying rounds, four countries progressed to the inter-zone ties. From the Australasian zone, New Zealand advanced to the next round after beating Australia 4-3. From the Asian zone the Indonesia team advanced to the inter-zone ties with a w/o against Thailand. In the European zone final Denmark defeated England 5-2. From the Pan American zone, Canada beating United States with 6-1

Inter-zone playoffs

First round

Second round

Final round
Japan won the Uber Cup title for the third consecutive time, after beating Indonesia in the final for the second consecutive time. Indonesia got its point from third singles player Intan Nurtjahja who won the first match of the tie. Japan's Noriko Nakayama, née Noriko Takagi, remained undefeated in Uber Cup singles.

Final round

External links
tangkis.tripod.com

Uber Cup
Thomas & Uber Cup
Uber Cup